Riley Township is one of the twelve townships of Sandusky County, Ohio, United States.  As of the 2000 census, 1,302 people lived in the township.

Geography
Located in the northeastern part of the county along Sandusky Bay, it borders the following townships:
Bay Township, Ottawa County - north, across Sandusky Bay
Portage Township, Ottawa County - northwest corner, across Sandusky Bay, north of Margarette Township
Margaretta Township, Erie County - northeast, across Sandusky Bay, south of Portage Township
Townsend Township - east
York Township - southeast corner
Green Creek Township - south
Ballville Township - southwest corner
Sandusky Township - west
Rice Township - northwest

No municipalities are located in Riley Township.

Name and history
Statewide, the only other Riley Township is located in Putnam County.

Government
The township is governed by a three-member board of trustees, who are elected in November of odd-numbered years to a four-year term beginning on the following January 1. Two are elected in the year after the presidential election and one is elected in the year before it. There is also an elected township fiscal officer, who serves a four-year term beginning on April 1 of the year after the election, which is held in November of the year before the presidential election. Vacancies in the fiscal officership or on the board of trustees are filled by the remaining trustees.

References

External links
County website

Townships in Sandusky County, Ohio
Townships in Ohio